Nigel Le Vaillant (born 11 June 1958) is a British former actor, who worked in television in the United Kingdom during the 1990s.

Early life
Le Vaillant's English father moved to Pakistan after service during the Second World War, and worked in the tea plantation industry there, eventually becoming Chief Executive for Brooke Bond in South Asia. Le Vaillant was born in the country and raised in Karachi. The family returned to England, settling in Sussex when he was 16, although he regularly returned to Asia, especially India, in the following years. He was educated at Bryanston school in England and at St Peter's College, Oxford, although he later stated that, despite his outward appearance, he "never felt like a Westerner".

Acting career
Le Vaillant began acting soon after the family returned to England, although he initially struggled to find work in the industry and spent nine years unemployed. After short appearances, such as P.C. Miller in The Gentle Touch in 1980, he spent three series in the BBC One drama Casualty playing the character of Dr. Julian Chapman, before leaving to star as the title character in the prime-time BBC series Dangerfield. He left the production in 1997, having married former Casualty star Nicola Jeffries two years earlier. He also appeared in the short-lived sitcom Honey for Tea, and in the cinema film Tom's Midnight Garden, playing the adult Tom.

He briefly returned to acting in 2009 to play British Prime Minister Edward Heath in the television drama Margaret.

Post acting life
He abandoned the acting profession in the early 2000s, being psychologically uneasy with the fame that comes with being a recognized figure on national television, and spends much of his time in Southern India where he is a property developer, while also maintaining a residence in Brixton, South London.

References

External links

1958 births
Living people
British male television actors
British expatriates in India
Male actors from Karachi
20th-century British male actors
21st-century British male actors
People educated at Bryanston School
Alumni of St Peter's College, Oxford